James Martin High School is a secondary school serving grades 9 through 12 in Arlington, Texas, United States. It is part of the Arlington Independent School District. The school's colors are red, black and silver.

History

Martin opened in 1982. As a result, the former James Bowie High School closed in 1983. The relative proximity of Bowie to Sam Houston High School was a factor as was the shifting demographics and resulting graduation class sizes that necessitated the new school and the transition of Bowie to Workman Junior High School. Cathy Brown of The Dallas Morning News said that Sam Houston High School and Lamar High School were "relatively unaffected" by the opening of Martin, located in southwest Arlington. Brown explained that the attendance zone of Arlington High School lost substantial area that included a significant number of new residences in the more affluent Southwest part of the city adjacent to Lake Arlington.

Martin High School is one of only two high schools in the district not named for a historical figure in Texas. The trustees broke with the Arlington tradition of naming high schools in this manner when naming the school in its planning in the earlier 1980s. Only Martin High School and Arlington High School, the town's first high school, are the only exceptions. AISD trustees chose to honor James W. Martin, superintendent of schools from 1955–1976, who oversaw the integration (racial desegregation) of Arlington schools in 1965, which occurred without the violence or hysterics that had occurred frequently nationwide, and notably in nearby Mansfield. This was not shared at the time of the school's opening, however.

The school opened with grades 10 through 12 and grew to become the city's largest high school within a decade. Construction in 1996-1997 expanded the size of the campus considerably to make room for the addition of freshmen in the 1997-1998 school year.

In July 2020, Principal Roddy announced the discontinuation of the native American mascot at the school, citing the reasoning was "...to adapt the school to modern standards of cultural sensitivity.", which has been a contentious topic in many communities and in professional sports, notably the NFL's Washington (former) Redskins and the Cleveland Indians major league baseball team. The change was met with opposition, primarily from alumni, but it was implemented. The Warrior would remain in writing, but the modern definition of the term is being embraced and will no longer refer to the Native American iconography, specifically the war bonnet and mascot. The school's 'rocking M' would become its primary graphic. The "Native American Tribal Chieftain hat" logo had been in use at the school since its opening in 1982, having been illustrated by one of its students. The war bonnet was formed by shaping the letters comprising 'Warriors' and the face was in the same manner using the letters MHS, both in red, forming a Native American chief in profile. Similar changes occurred later at nearby South Grand Prairie High School, which coincidentally are known at the Warriors.

Feeder patterns 
Corey, Moore, and Wood Elementaries feed into Boles Jr. High. Ditto, Little, Miller, and a portion of Dunn Elementaries feed into Young Jr. High. Boles and Young Jr. Highs feed into Martin.

Demographics
The demographic breakdown of the 3,298 students enrolled in 2013-14 was:
Male - 52.1%
Female - 47.9%
Native American/Alaskan - 0.5%
Asian/Pacific islanders - 6.8%
Black - 13.4%
Hispanic - 16.8%
White - 59.9%
Multiracial - 2.6%

24.9% of the students were eligible for free or reduced lunch.

Extracurricular activities

Academic extracurriculars
Martin competes in Academic Decathlon and fills out teams in nearly all of the UIL academic activities.

The Martin High School Robotics team has qualified for every UIL Robotics State Championship since Robotics was first added in 2016, finishing 2nd in 2017 and 2018, 3rd in 2019, and winning the state title in 2020. 

The Martin High School Science Team won the UIL 6A State Championship in 2021.

Fine arts
The Department of Fine Arts at Martin High School includes Band, Choir, Orchestra, Theatre, Speech, and Visual Arts departments.

In 2009, the Martin Fine Arts department was the 1st-place winner in the "Grammy in the Schools" nationwide competition, giving them a $10,000 grant to the Music Department, and naming the Martin High School Fine Arts department the #1 fine arts high school in the contest.

Martin’s Chorale choir performed at Carnegie Hall in New York City on March 14, 2006 for the Carnegie Hall National High School Choral Festival. The performance included the world premieres of Introit and Epilogue by Mack Wilberg. Martin’s Chorale, Wind Symphony, and Symphony Orchestra performed at Carnegie Hall in New York City on March 21, 2016 with Distinguished Concerts International New York.

Notable alumni

 Matt Blank, Major League Baseball (MLB) pitcher
 Elizabeth Bruenig, Pulitzer Prize for Feature Writing 2019 nominee
 Myles Garrett, NFL football player
 Mitch Grassi, tenor of a cappella group Pentatonix
 Ben Grieve, Major League Baseball outfielder
 Justin Hollins, NFL football player
 Scott Hoying, baritone of a cappella group Pentatonix
 Jason Huntley, NFL football player
Nathan Karns, MLB pitcher
 Kirstin Maldonado, mezzo-soprano of a cappella group Pentatonix
 Randi Miller, Olympic women's wrestling
 Blake Mycoskie, founder of TOMS Shoes
 Chris Odom, football player
 Stacey Oristano, actress
 Tim Rushlow, country musician
 Boone Stutz, NFL football player
 Lane Taylor, NFL offensive lineman
 Todd Van Poppel, Major League Baseball pitcher
 Emily Warfield, actress
 Tay-K, rapper

References

External links

 
 Arlington Independent School District homepage

Arlington Independent School District high schools
High schools in Arlington, Texas
1982 establishments in Texas
Educational institutions established in 1982